Voorburg is a railway station located in Voorburg, Netherlands on the Gouda–Den Haag railway.  The station was opened on 1 May 1870 and The train services are operated by Nederlandse Spoorwegen. The station is also frequented by several local and some regional public bus-services.

Location and history
Station Voorburg is situated in the most Southern part of the historic town center of Voorburg. It parallels motorway A12 which lies next to the railway at this point. Both motorway and railway-tracks/platform are elevated on long viaducts which spans different roads, streets and Canal de Vliet. In the Western direction starts the rail yard which end at station Den Haag Centraal.

Hofwijck
Next to the station lies Hofwijck mansion which at present houses a museum of the town history and of its former owners Christiaan and Constantijn Huygens. Before the railway, motorway and station were built the area was a part of the then much bigger Hofwijck estate.

Stationbuilding
The present elevated building was the last station designed by Koen van der Gaast. Its construction started by 1986. Before there was only a little building designed by A.W. van Erkel.

Train services
The following services currently call at Voorburg:
2x per hour local service (sprinter) The Hague - Gouda - Utrecht
2x per hour local service (sprinter) The Hague - Gouda Goverwelle

References

External links
NS website
Dutch Public Transport journey planner

Railway stations in South Holland
Railway stations opened in 1870
Leidschendam-Voorburg